The 2008-09 Biathlon World Cup/Pursuit  Men started at Sunday December 7, 2008 in Östersund and will finish Saturday March 28, 2009 in Khanty-Mansiysk. Defending titlist is Ole Einar Bjørndalen of Norway.

Competition format
In a pursuit, biathletes' starts are separated by their time differences from a previous race, most commonly a sprint. The contestant crossing the finish line first is the winner. To prevent awkward and/or dangerous crowding of the skiing loops, and overcapacity at the shooting range, World Cup Pursuits are held with only the 60 top ranking biathletes after the preceding race. The biathletes shoot (on a first-come, first-served basis) at the lane corresponding to the position they arrived for all shooting bouts.

2007-08 Top 3 Standings

Medal winners

Final standings

References

Biathlon World Cup - Pursuit Men, 2008-09